Ault Hucknall is a civil parish in the Bolsover district of Derbyshire, England.  The parish contains 23 listed buildings that are recorded in the National Heritage List for England.  Of these, three are listed at Grade I, the highest of the three grades, one is at Grade II*, the middle grade, and the others are at Grade II, the lowest grade.  The parish contains the village of Ault Hucknall and the surrounding area, including the settlements of Astwith, Hardstoft, and Rowthorne.  The most important buildings in the parish are Hardwick Hall and its predecessor Hardwick Old Hall, which are listed together with associated structures in the grounds and surrounding parkland.  The other listed buildings include a church and a chest tomb in the churchyard, houses and farmhouses, a public house, a watermill, a former Sunday school, and a war memorial.


Key

Buildings

References

Citations

Sources

 

Lists of listed buildings in Derbyshire